The Shalmani or Shilmani is a Pashtun tribe primarily concentrated in the Shalman Valley in Khyber Agency near Peshawar, Khyber Pakhtunkhwa, Pakistan. The tribe is present in different parts of Pakistan. In Pakistan, the tribe lives in Swat, Upper Dir, Lower Dir, Bajour, Buner, Shangla, Malakand District, Dargai, Charsadda  (Hashtnagar).

According to Khan Roshan Khan, in his book about Pashtun's history "Tazkira" at page-379/380,"Shalmanis(Shilmanis) are "Banu Bakhtar"(بنو بختر) who were living in an area "Shalman" in Syria.These Banu Bakhtar were the land lords of areas like Shalman(شلمان), Ainab(عيناب) and Baiswad(بيسود) in Syria.

Similar to Shalman of Khyber, a city by name Shalman is also present in Gilan Province of Iran, and the fourth largest river in Iran is also named as Shalman. These landmarks with synonym Shalman suggest that this tribe could have moved from Syria through Iran (Gilan Shalman) to current Shalman Valley in Khyber Agency near Peshawar, Khyber Pakhtunkhwa, Pakistan.

History

Roshan Khan in his book "Tazkira" wrote that Shalmani were originally brought to Swat (not to be confused with just Swat district of the present times) by the famous conqueror and King, Muhammad of Ghor, from Shalman Valley of Khyber Agency in present Pakistan and Karman of today's Afghanistan.

M.Saida Khan Shinwari states in his book that, Shilmani are counted as Ghoryakhel tribe divided as Shamsher Khel, Halimzai and Kam Shilmanis and considers them to be Mohmand. He states that Shamsher Khels are related to Morcha Khel Mohmands, Halimzai to Halimzai Mohmands and Kam Shilmanis to Tarakzai Mohmands. Officially the Shilmanis are treated as a separate tribe since the Khyber Agreement of 1881. The Shilmanis are closer to Mohmands in characteristics and based on historical evidence they appear to be close kinsmen of the Mohmand.

Shalmani are called as "Shalmani Momands" by Harold Carmichael Wylly, at page-317 in his book "From the Black Mountain to Waziristan".

Prior to creation of Pakistan Bacha Khan Shalmani of Sakha Kot Malakand Agency, was the prominent figure of the Shalmani tribe and was a politician. Mr. Naek Amal Khan Shalmani and Rahat Khan Shalmani are scions of his family.

References

Further reading

Sarbani Pashtun tribes
Demographics of Pakistan
Social groups of Pakistan